Samuel Martinez (born 1959) is a Cuban-born American ethnologist, ethnographer, cultural anthropologist, and professor at the University of Connecticut. He has published extensively on the struggle for human rights for Haitian immigrants in the Dominican Republic and their Dominican-born offspring. He has also done research on north–south knowledge exchange in human rights and on the rhetoric and visual culture of activism against modern slavery.

Early life and education 
Born in Cuba in 1959, Martinez and his family emigrated in 1961, living first in Colombia and then the United States.

Martinez earned a BS in biological sciences from Stanford University in 1981. He next attended the Johns Hopkins University, where he studied social and cultural anthropology under the mentorship of Sidney Mintz, Richard Price, and Michel-Rolph Trouillot, obtaining a M.A. in 1984 and a PhD in 1992. Martinez is fluent in Spanish and speaks French and Haitian Kreyol.

Career 
Since 1997, Martinez has served as a professor of anthropology and Latin American studies at the University of Connecticut. Since 2017, he has been the director of El Instituto: Institute of Latina/o, Caribbean and Latin American Studies. He has chaired the American Anthropological Association's Committee for Human Rights (2003–2004) and was Program Chair of the AAA's Annual Meeting in 2016. He has served on the board of the American Ethnological Society (2010–2014) and in 2013 organized the AES annual meeting in conjunction with the Society for Visual Anthropology.

In 2016, Martinez received the American Anthropological Association's President's Award for outstanding service to the association.

Research 
During his doctoral work, Martinez studied the movement of migrant workers from Haiti to sugar plantations in the Dominican Republic. This was done through conducting field work in both a rural peasant community in Haiti and a sugar plantation in the southeastern portion of the Dominican Republic. Through this field work, Martinez found that the circular migration of Haitians to Dominican sugar plantations was both a response to desperate poverty but also a petty accumulation strategy, involving repeated seasonal migration to the Dominican Republic and investment of their savings in the migrants' home places in rural Haiti. As a result of this fieldwork and his subsequent field research experiences, he has become a central figure in a small multi-disciplinary cluster of researchers who study processes that link the two countries within a single island social, cultural and economic unit. One of his most widely cited publications, "Not a Cockfight", appeared in Latin American Perspectives in 2003. In that paper, Martinez raised questions about the excessive pessimism of the "fatal conflict model" of Haitian-Dominican relations, according to which the two nations were destined to fight forever like roosters caught within a single island cage. Scholars of more recent generations have expanded on this reinterpretation by giving careful attention to evidence that bi-national conflict is not inevitable but rather has been stoked by politicians on both sides of the border seeking easy nationalist talking points.

In a paper published in American Anthropologist in 1996, titled "Indifference within Indignation", Martinez explored the issue of modern slavery years before the widespread emergence of conversations surrounding the topics of captive exploitation, human trafficking, and sweatshops.

At the request of Laurel Fletcher, the head of the Berkeley School of Law International Human Rights Law Clinic, Martinez in 2005 contributed an expert affidavit to the Inter-American Court of Human rights, in support of the plaintiffs, Dilcia Yean and Violeta Bosico, who had been denied birth certificates by civil registry officials in the Dominican Republic. The Court ruled that Yean and Bosico were effectively and unjustly being denied birthright citizenship. The similar case of Juliana Deguis Pierre, a Dominican of Haitian ancestry whose citizenship was revoked in 2008, became a topic of widespread international concern after a Dominican high court ruled, in the Sentencia 168 of 2013, to revoke her citizenship and that of tens of thousands of other Dominicans of foreign ancestry. In the years since 2005, Martinez had tracked the official Dominican backlash against the Inter-American Court's Yean and Bosico verdict. He corrected simplifications in the news coverage and media commentary about the Sentencia 168, giving emphasis to the Sentencia's place within a sequence of bureaucratic and legislative moves. In a paper co-authored with scholar/activist Bridget Wooding and published in 2017 in the Mexican journal Migración y Desarrollo ("El antihaitianismo en la República Dominicana ¿un giro biopolítico? [Anti-Haitianism in the Dominican Republic: A Biopolitical Turn?"]), Martinez and Wooding made the case that the new Dominican anti-Haitianism does not aim to expel Haitians and Haitian descendants en masse but rather seeks to confine them more effectively within the lower tier of the country's politics and economics. This paper and other recent chapters of Martinez's work have thus sought to open new dialogues on the role of technology in bureaucratizing anti-Black and anti-immigrant oppression in the Dominican Republic.

Publications

Books
1995 – Peripheral Migrants: Haitians and Dominican Republic Sugar Plantations. Knoxville: The University of Tennessee Press.
2007 – Decency and Excess: Global Aspirations and Material Deprivation on a Caribbean Sugar Plantation. Boulder: Paradigm Publishers.

Edited volumes
2009 – International Migration and Human Rights: The Global Repercussions of U.S. Policy. Berkeley: University of California Press, Global, Area, and International Archive, 11.
2016 – Interrogating the Perpetrator: Violation, Culpability, and Human Rights. New York: Routledge (with Cathy Schlund-Vials)

Articles

Guest editorship, journal special issues 
2015 – (with Cathy Schlund-Vials) "Special Issue: Perpetratorhood". International Journal of Human Rights 19(5).
2011 – (with Kathryn Libal) "Dossier on Gender and Humanitarianism". Humanity 2(2).
2006 – (with Charles V. Carnegie) "Crossing Borders of Language and Culture". Small Axe: A Caribbean Journal of Criticism 19.

Guest editorship, virtual special issue (non-peer-reviewed) 
2014 – "American Ethnologist virtual issue, In/Visibility: Projects, Media, Politics, 2012–2013".

Peer-reviewed articles, sole author 
2018 – "Upstreaming or Streamlining? Translating Social Movement Agenda into Legal Claims in Nepal and the Dominican Republic". In Human Rights Transformation in an Unequal World. Tine Destrooper and Sally Engle Merry, editors. Pp. 128–156. Philadelphia: University of Pennsylvania Press.
2017 – "Peripheral Migrants: Haiti-Dominican Republic Mobilities in Caribbean Context". In Global Latin(o) Americanos: Transoceanic Diasporas and Regional Migrations. Mark Overmyer-Velázquez and Enrique Sepúlveda, editors. Pp. 71–94. New York: Oxford University Press.
2016 –  "A Postcolonial Indemnity? New Premises for International Solidarity with Haitian-Dominican Rights". Iberoamericana. Nordic Journal of Latin American and Caribbean Studies 44(102): 173–93.
2015 – "From Commoditizing to Commodifying Human Rights: Research on Forced Labor in Dominican Sugar Production". Humanity 6(3): 387–409.
2014 – "The Price of Confrontation: International Retributive Justice and the Struggle for Haitian-Dominican Rights". In The Uses and Misuses of Human Rights: A Critical Approach to Advocacy. George Andreopoulos and Zehra Arat, editors. Pp. 89–115. New York: Palgrave.
2013 – "An Anthropologist among Human Rights Experts in Haiti and the Dominican Republic: Para-ethnographic Perspectives on Culture and Rights". Australian Journal of Human Rights 19(1): 11–29.
2012 –  "Allegations Lost and Found: The Afterlife of Dominican Sugar Slavery". Third World Quarterly 33(10): 1855–1870.
2011 – "'Taking Better Account': Contemporary Slavery, Gendered Narratives and the Feminization of Struggle". Humanity 2(2): 277–303.
2011 – "The Onion of Oppression: Haitians in the Dominican Republic". In Geographies of the Haitian Diaspora. Regine O. Jackson, editor. Pp. 51–70. New York: Routledge.
2010 – "Excess: The Struggle for Expenditure on a Caribbean Sugar Plantation". Current Anthropology 51(5): 609–28.
2009 – "Toward an Anthropology of Excess: Wanting More (while Getting Less) On a Caribbean Global Periphery". In Empirical Futures: Anthropologists and Historians Engage the Work of Sidney W. Mintz. George Baca, Aisha Khan and Stephan Palmié, editors. Pp. 196–225. Durham: University of North Carolina Press.
2009 – "Introduction" and "Conclusions". In International Migration and Human Rights: The Global Repercussions of US Policy. Samuel Martínez, editor. Pp. 1–22 &amp; 237–52. Berkeley: University of California Press.
2008 – "Making Violence Visible: An Activist Anthropological Approach to Women's Rights Investigation". In Engaging Contradictions: Theory, Politics, and Methods of Activist Scholarship, Charles Hale, editor. Pp. 183–209. Berkeley: University of California Press.
2005 – "Searching for a Middle Path: Rights, Capabilities, and Political Culture in the Study of Female Genital Cutting". Ahfad (Omdurman, Sudan) 22(1): 31–44.
2003 – "Not a Cockfight: Rethinking Haitian-Dominican Relations". Latin American Perspectives 30(3): 80–101.
2003 – "Identities at the Dominican and Puerto Rican International Migrant Crossroads". In Marginal Migrations: The Circulation of Cultures within the Caribbean, Shalini Puri, ed. Pp. 141–64. London: Macmillan.
1999 – "From Hidden Hand to Heavy Hand: Sugar, the State, and Migrant Labor in Haiti and the Dominican Republic". Latin American Research Review 34(1): 57–84.
1997 – "The Masking of History: Popular Images of the Nation on a Dominican Sugar Plantation". Nieuwe West-Indische Gids/New West Indian Guide 71(3 &amp; 4): 227– 48.
1996 – "Indifference within Indignation: Anthropology, Human Rights, and the Haitian Bracero". American Anthropologist 98(1): 17–25. Jointly-authored peer-reviewed Article, first author:
2017 – (with Bridget Wooding) "El antihaitianismo en la República Dominicana ¿un giro biopolítico?" ("Anti-Haitianism in the Dominican Republic: A Biopolitical Turn?") Migración y Desarrollo vol. 15, no. 28: 95 123.

Jointly-authored peer-reviewed articles, second author 
2009 – (with María Teresa Restrepo-Ruiz) "Impact of Plan Colombia on Forced Displacement". In International Migration and Human Rights: The Global Repercussions of US Policy. Samuel Martínez, editor. Pp. 199–215. Berkeley: University of California Press, Global, Area, and International Archive, 11.
1998 – (with Toye Brewer and others) "Migration, Ethnicity and Environment: HIV Risk Factors for Women on the Sugar Cane Plantations of the Dominican Republic". AIDS 12: 1879–87.

Jointly-authored non-peer-reviewed introductions to peer-reviewed special issues 
2015 – (with Cathy Schlund-Vials) "Interrogating the Perpetrator: Violation, Culpability and Human Rights". International Journal of Human Rights 19(5): 549–554.
2011 – (with Kathryn Libal) "Introduction: The Gender of Humanitarian Narrative". Humanity 2(2): 161–70. Peer-Reviewed Reference Works:
2017 – (with Catherine Buerger) "Human Rights". In Oxford Bibliographies in Anthropology. (Updated edition of an entry first published as sole author in 2013.) John L. Jackson, Jr., editor. New York: Oxford University Press.
1999 – "Migration from the Caribbean: Economic and Political Factors versus Legal and Illegal Status". In Illegal Immigration in America: A Reference Handbook, David W. Haines and Karen E. Rosenblum, eds. Pp. 273–92. Westport: Greenwood Publishing.

Expert affidavit 

 2005. – "Declaración pericial ... en apoyo a la Comisión Inter-Americana y los peticionarios originales en Yean y Bosico v. República Dominicana"

Non-refereed articles, sole author 
2017 – "115 th Annual Meeting, Minneapolis". Anthropology News 58(2): 27.
2016 – "AAA Annual Meeting Highlights Racism, Border-Crossers and Environmental Justice". Anthropology News 57 (11–12): 20–21.
2016 – "Annual Meeting Executive Sessions". Anthropology News 57(7–8): 26–27
2016 – "Meeting in Minneapolis". Anthropology News 57(3–4): 14.
2016 – "Meet the 2016 Annual Meeting Program and Site Committee". Anthropology News 57(1–2): 19.
2015 – "115th AAA Annual Meeting Call for Papers: Evidence, Accident, Discovery, Minneapolis, MN, November 16–20, 2016". Anthropology News 56(11–12): 39.
2002 – "Activist Anthropology: Working Together and Sharing the Gain". GSC Quarterly 5.

Non-refereed articles, second author 
2016 – (with Agustín Fuentes) "Love Your Poster". Anthropology News 57(3–4): 15.
2004 – (with Lorraine Chaudhry-Campbell) "National Security and International Migration". Anthropology Newsletter 45(5): 28.

References 

Living people
1959 births
University of Connecticut faculty
American ethnologists
American anthropologists
Cultural anthropologists
Latin Americanists
American people of Cuban descent
Stanford University alumni
Johns Hopkins University alumni